I'll Be Your Mirror: A Tribute to The Velvet Underground & Nico is a tribute album, by various artists, to the eponymous 1967 album The Velvet Underground & Nico by American rock band the Velvet Underground and German singer Nico. The tribute album was released by Verve Records and Universal Music Group on September 24, 2021, and features recordings of the original album's 11 songs by artists including St. Vincent, Sharon Van Etten, Bobby Gillespie, and Iggy Pop among others. The album released in proximity to The Velvet Underground, a documentary on the band by director Todd Haynes which was released October 15.

Track listing

Charts

References 

2021 compilation albums
The Velvet Underground tribute albums
Albums produced by Hal Willner
Universal Music Group albums
Verve Records albums